Sergey Nikolayevich Popov (16 March 1929 – 2 December 2018) was a Soviet hurdler. He competed in the men's 110 metres hurdles at the 1952 Summer Olympics.

References

1929 births
2018 deaths
Athletes (track and field) at the 1952 Summer Olympics
Soviet male hurdlers
Olympic athletes of the Soviet Union
Place of birth missing